The Kandahar–Herat Highway is  section of road that links the cities of Kandahar and Herat in Afghanistan. This highway is part of a larger road network, the "Ring Road", and was first constructed by the Soviets in the 1960s.  The Kandahar-Herat Highway is made up of two sections of "National Highway 1": NH0101 runs from Kandahar to Girishk, and NH0102 runs from Girishk to Herat.

History
In October 2004 reconstruction of the highway began and was expected to be completed by the end of 2006. The United States is funding a  portion of the road, Saudi Arabia is funding a  section and Japan is contributing to rebuilding . The U.S. portion of the Kandahar-Herat highway has reduced travel time between those two major cities from 10 hours to 4.3 hours.

Connectivity with Route 606: Delaram-Zaranj Highway
The Delaram–Zaranj Highway, also known as Route 606, is a  two-lane road built by India in Afghanistan, connecting Delaram in Farah Province with Zaranj in neighbouring Nimruz Province near the Iranian border. It connects the Afghan–Iranian border with the Kandahar–Herat Highway in Delaram, which provides connectivity to other major Afghan cities via A01. Route 606 reduces travel time between Delaram and Zaranj from the earlier 12–14 hours to just 2 hours.

See also
 Kabul-Kandahar Highway

References

External links

 

Afghanistan–Soviet Union relations
Roads in Afghanistan
Soviet foreign aid